In underground mining a hoist or winder is used to raise and lower conveyances within the mine shaft.  Modern hoists are normally powered using electric motors, historically with direct current drives utilizing Ward Leonard control machines and later solid-state converters (thyristors), however modern large hoists use alternating current drives that are variable frequency controlled. There are three principal types of hoists used in mining applications:

Drum hoist

Drum hoists are the most common type of hoist used in North America, South Africa and South America.  When using a drum hoist the hoisting cable is wound around the drum when the conveyance is lifted.  Single-drum hoists can be used in smaller applications, however double-drum hoists easily allow the hoisting of two conveyances in balance (i.e. one skip being lifted while a second skip is being lowered).  Drum hoists are mounted on concrete slabs within a hoistroom, the hoisting ropes run from the drum, up to the top of the headframe, over a sheave wheel and down where they connect to the conveyance (cage or skip).

Advantages
Drum hoists require less routine maintenance than a friction hoist, because the haulage cable is fixed to the drum, and therefore have less downtime, and the maintenance regime is less sophisticated.  Drum hoists can continue to operate if the shaft bottom gets flooded and less shaft depth is required below the loading pocket, unlike friction hoists where such flooding could cover the tail ropes  and so on.  Because drum hoists do not have tail ropes, the hoisting system is more suited to slinging beneath a conveyance.

Disadvantages
Drum hoists take up more space than a friction hoist for the same service as all of the haulage cable must be accommodated on the drum when the hoist is fully raised.  Drum hoists require rapid fluctuations in power demand, which can pose a problem if power is generated on site rather than provided through the main power grid.

Friction hoist

Friction (or Koepe) hoists are the most common type of hoist used in Europe, Asia and Australia.  The friction hoist was invented in 1877 by Frederick Koepe.  Friction hoists are mounted on the ground above the mine shaft, or at the top of the headframe.  Friction hoists utilize tail ropes and counterweights and do not have the haulage rope fixed to the wheel, but instead passed around it. The tailropes and weights offset the need for the motor to overcome the weight of the conveyance and hoisting rope, thereby reducing the required horsepower of the hoisting motor by up to 30%, with the overall power consumption remaining the same.  Friction hoists, unlike drum hoists, can and normally do use multiple ropes giving them a larger payload capacity, however since they require a larger safety factor, they are impractical for very deep shafts.

Advantages
New friction hoists are less expensive than new drum hoists, and the lead time for delivery may be shorter as there is more competition for manufacturing.  Multi-rope friction hoists have a larger lift capacity than a drum hoist.  A friction hoist is smaller in diameter than a drum hoist for the same service, making it easier to ship and install than a drum hoist.

Disadvantages
Balanced friction hoists are not suitable for hoisting from multiple loading pockets on different horizons within a shaft, and are generally not suitable for deep shafts.  Friction hoists can not operate at normal speeds if the shaft bottom is flooded and water reaches the tail ropes.

Blair multi-rope hoist
The Blair multi-rope hoist is a variation of the double-drum hoist.  It is used in extremely deep shafts as the second drums cable are used to balance the primary load.

Examples of hoists

See also 

 Hoist (device)
 Pulley
 Winch
 Hard Rock Miner's Handbook
 Glossary of coal mining terminology

Footnotes

Underground mining
Vertical transport devices
Winches